Humblus (Humbli, Humble) was one of the earliest kings of Denmark according to Saxo Grammaticus's Gesta Danorum.

Humblus may be of the same origin as King Humli of Hervarar saga.

Text

The standing on stones in connection with the choosing a king is a motive known from other Scandinavian sources. It occurs both in Chronicon Lethrense and Olaus Magnus's Swedish history.

Notes

References

 Davidson, Hilda Ellis (ed.) and Peter Fisher (tr.) (1999). Saxo Grammaticus : The History of the Danes : Books I-IX. Bury St Edmunds: St Edmundsbury Press. . First published 1979–1980.
 Elton, Oliver (tr.) (1905). The Nine Books of the Danish History of Saxo Grammaticus. New York: Norroena Society. Available online
 Olrik, J. and H. Ræder (1931). Saxo Grammaticus : Gesta Danorum. Available online



Mythological kings of Denmark
Scyldings